The PlayStation 2 (PS2) is a home video game console developed and marketed by Sony Computer Entertainment. It was first released in Japan on 4 March 2000, in North America on 26 October 2000, in Europe on 24 November 2000, and in Australia on 30 November 2000. It is the successor to the original PlayStation, as well as the second installment in the PlayStation brand of consoles. As a sixth-generation console, it competed with Nintendo's GameCube, Sega's Dreamcast, and Microsoft's Xbox. It is the best-selling video game console of all time, having sold over 155 million units worldwide.

Announced in 1999, Sony began developing the console after the immense success of its predecessor. The PS2 offered backward-compatibility for its predecessor's DualShock controller, as well as its games. 

The PlayStation 2 received widespread critical acclaim upon release. A total of over 4,000 game titles were released worldwide, with over 1.5 billion copies sold. In 2004, Sony released a smaller, lighter revision of the console known as the PS2 Slim. Even after the release of its successor, the PlayStation 3, it remained popular well into the seventh generation. It continued to be produced until 2013 when Sony finally announced that it had been discontinued after over twelve years of production, one of the longest lifespans of any video game console. By the end of its life, the new games were launched posthumously for the console.

History

Background
Released in 1994, the original PlayStation proved to be a phenomenal worldwide success and signalled Sony's rise to power in the video game industry. Its launch elicited critical acclaim and strong sales; it eventually became the first computer entertainment platform to ship over 100 million units. The PlayStation enjoyed particular success outside Japan in part due to Sony's refined development kits, large-scale advertising campaigns, and strong third-party developer support. By the late 1990s Sony had dethroned established rivals Sega and Nintendo in the global video game market. Sega, spurred on by its declining market share and significant financial losses, launched the Dreamcast in 1998 as a last-ditch attempt to stay in the industry.

Development
Though Sony has kept details of the PlayStation 2's development secret, Ken Kutaragi, the chief designer of the original PlayStation, reportedly began working on a second console around the time of the original PlayStation's launch in late 1994. At some point during development, employees from Argonaut Games, under contract for semiconductor manufacturer LSI Corporation, were instructed to design a rendering chip for Sony's upcoming console. Jez San, founder of Argonaut, recalled that his team had no direct contact with Sony during the development process. Unbeknownst to him, Sony was designing their own chip in-house and had instructed other companies to design rendering chips merely to diversify their options.

By early 1997, the press was reporting that a new PlayStation was being developed and would have backward-compatibility with the original PlayStation, a built-in DVD player, and Internet connectivity. However, Sony continued to officially deny that a successor was being developed. Chris Deering, then-president of SCEE recalled that there was a degree of trepidation among Sony leaders to produce a console which would recapture or exceed the success of its predecessor.

Sony announced the PlayStation 2 on March 2, 1999. Sega's Dreamcast enjoyed a successful US launch on September 9 of that year; fuelled by a large marketing campaign, it sold over 500,000 units within two weeks.

Sony unveiled the PlayStation 2 at the Tokyo Game Show on 20 September 1999. Sony showed fully playable demos of upcoming PlayStation 2 games including Gran Turismo 2000 (later released as Gran Turismo 3: A-Spec) and Tekken Tag Tournament—which showed the console's graphic abilities and power.

Launch
The PS2 was launched in March 2000 in Japan, October in North America, and November in Europe. Sales of the console, games and accessories pulled in $250 million on the first day, beating the $97 million made on the first day of the Dreamcast. Directly after its release, it was difficult to find PS2 units on retailer shelves due to manufacturing delays. Another option was purchasing the console online through auction websites such as eBay, where people paid over a thousand dollars for the console. The PS2 initially sold well partly on the basis of the strength of the PlayStation brand and the console's backward compatibility, selling its entire inventory of 1.4 million units in Japan by 31 March 2000, less than a month after launch. Backward compatibility had been widely seen as a desirable feature for consumers since the debut of the first successor video game console, but prior to the PlayStation 2 only one console had featured true backward compatibility (i.e. without the use of add-ons), the Atari 7800, due to the added hardware costs and industry concerns that backward compatibility could cause the console to appear to be a merely a new model of its predecessor or lead developers to prefer making games for the predecessor system.

Later, Sony added new development kits for game developers and more PS2 units for consumers. The PS2's built-in functionality also expanded its audience beyond the gamer, as its debut pricing was less than many standalone DVD players on the market. This made the console a low-cost entry into the home theater market.

Marketing for the PlayStation 2 reverted to the same tactic used in the early days of the original PlayStation: use 17-year-olds as the target audience, since younger audiences aspire to be teenagers and older audiences enjoy video games at the same level they did when they were 17.

The success of the PS2 at the end of 2000 caused Sega problems both financially and competitively, and Sega announced the discontinuation of the Dreamcast in March 2001, just 18 months after its successful Western launch. Despite the Dreamcast still receiving support through 2001, the PS2 remained the only sixth-generation console for over 6 months before it faced competition from new rivals: Nintendo's GameCube and Microsoft's Xbox. Many analysts predicted a close three-way matchup among the three consoles. The Xbox had the most powerful hardware, while the GameCube was the least expensive console, and Nintendo changed its policy to encourage third-party developers. While the PlayStation 2 theoretically had the weakest specification of the three, it had a head start due to its installed base plus strong developer commitment, as well as a built-in DVD player (the Xbox required an adapter, while the GameCube lacked support entirely). While the PlayStation 2's initial games lineup was considered mediocre, this changed during the 2001 holiday season with the release of several blockbuster games that maintained the PS2's sales momentum and held off its newer rivals. Sony also countered the Xbox by securing timed PlayStation 2 exclusives for highly anticipated games such as the Grand Theft Auto series and Metal Gear Solid 2: Sons of Liberty.

Sony cut the price of the console in May 2002 from US$299 to $199 in North America, making it the same price as the GameCube and $100 less than the Xbox. It also planned to cut the price in Japan around that time. It cut the price twice in Japan in 2003. In 2006, Sony cut the cost of the console in anticipation of the release of the PlayStation 3.

Unlike Sega's Dreamcast, Sony originally placed little emphasis on online gaming during its first few years, although that changed upon the launch of the online-capable Xbox. Coinciding with the release of Xbox Live, Sony released the PlayStation Network Adapter in late 2002, with several online first-party titles released alongside it, such as SOCOM U.S. Navy SEALs to demonstrate its active support for Internet play. Sony also advertised heavily, and its online model had the support of Electronic Arts (EA); EA did not offer online Xbox titles until 2004. Although Sony and Nintendo both started late, and although both followed a decentralized model of online gaming where the responsibility is up to the developer to provide the servers, Sony's moves made online gaming a major selling point of the PS2.

In September 2004, in time for the launch of Grand Theft Auto: San Andreas, Sony revealed a newer, slimmer model of the PlayStation 2. In preparation for the launch of the new models (SCPH-700xx-9000x), Sony stopped making the older models (SCPH-3000x-500xx) to let the distribution channel empty its stock of the units. After an apparent manufacturing issue—Sony reportedly underestimated demand—caused some initial slowdown in producing the new unit caused in part by shortages between the time Sony cleared out the old units and the new units were ready. The issue was compounded in Britain when a Russian oil tanker became stuck in the Suez Canal, blocking a ship from China carrying PS2s bound for the UK. During one week in November, British sales totalled 6,000 units—compared to 70,000 units a few weeks prior. There were shortages in more than 1,700 shops in North America on the day before Christmas.

Later years
In 2010, Sony introduced a TV with a built-in PlayStation 2.

The PlayStation 2 continued to be produced until 2013 when Sony finally announced that it had been discontinued after over twelve years of production—one of the longest lifespans of any video game console. New games for the console continued to be made until the end of 2013, including Final Fantasy XI: Seekers of Adoulin for Japan, and FIFA 14 for North America. The last game to be released on the PlayStation 2 is Pro Evolution Soccer 2014, which was released in the United Kingdom on 8 November 2013. Repair services for the system in Japan ended on 7 September 2018.

Hardware

Technical specifications

The PlayStation 2's main central processing unit (CPU) is the 128-bit R5900-based "Emotion Engine", custom-designed by Sony and Toshiba. The Emotion Engine consists of eight separate "units", each performing a specific task, integrated onto the same die. These units include a central CPU core, two Vector Processing Units (VPU), a 10-channel DMA unit, a memory controller, and an Image Processing Unit (IPU). There are three interfaces: an input output interface to the I/O processor running at a clock speed of 36.864MHz, a graphics interface to the graphics synthesiser, and a memory interface to the system memory. The Emotion Engine CPU has a clock rate of 294.912 MHz (299 MHz on newer versions) and 6,000 MIPS, with a floating point performance of 6.2 GFLOPS.

The GPU is likewise custom-designed for the console, named the "Graphics Synthesiser". It has a fillrate of 2.4 gigapixels per second, capable of rendering up to 75 million polygons per second. The GPU also runs with a clock frequency of 147.456 MHz (which is half the clock speed of the Emotion Engine), 4 MB of DRAM is capable of transmitting a display output of 1280 x 1024 pixels on both PAL and NTSC televisions. The PlayStation 2 has a maximum colour depth of 16.7 million true colours. When accounting for features such as lighting, texture mapping, artificial intelligence, and game physics, the console has a real-world performance of 25 million polygons per second. The PlayStation 2 also features two USB ports, and one IEEE 1394 (Firewire) port for SCPH-10000 to 3900x models only. A hard disk drive can be installed in an expansion bay on the back of the console, and is required to play certain games, notably the popular Final Fantasy XI.

Software for the PlayStation 2 was distributed primarily on DVD-ROMs, with some titles being published on blue-tinted CD-ROM format. In addition, the console can play audio CDs and DVD films and is backward-compatible with almost all original PlayStation games. The PlayStation 2 also supports PlayStation memory cards and controllers, although original PlayStation memory cards will only work with original PlayStation games and the controllers may not support all functions (such as analogue buttons) for PlayStation 2 games.

The standard PlayStation 2 memory card has an 8 megabyte (MB) capacity and features MagicGate encryption. There are a variety of non-Sony manufactured memory cards available for the PlayStation 2, allowing for a memory capacity larger than the standard 8 MB.

The PlayStation 2 can natively output video resolutions on SDTV and HDTV from 480i to 480p, and some games, such as Gran Turismo 4 and Tourist Trophy, are known to support up-scaled 1080i resolution using any of the following standards: composite video [should read component video - the higher resolution RGB connector for video ](480i), S-Video (480i), RGB (480i/p), VGA (for progressive scan games and PS2 Linux only),  component [should read composite video - the single, lower resolution yellow connector for video] video (which display most original PlayStation games in their native 240p mode which most HDTV sets do not support), and D-Terminal. Cables are available for all of these signal types; these cables also output analogue stereo audio. Additionally, an RF modulator is available for the system to connect to older TVs.

Models

The PlayStation 2 has undergone many revisions, some only of internal construction and others involving substantial external changes.

The PS2 is primarily differentiated between models featuring the original "fat" case design and "slimline" models, which were introduced at the end of 2004. In 2010, the Sony Bravia KDL-22PX300 was made available to consumers. It was a 22" HD-Ready television which incorporated a built-in PlayStation 2.

The PS2 standard color is matte black. Several variations in color were produced in different quantities and regions, including ceramic white, light yellow, metallic blue (aqua), metallic silver, navy (star blue), opaque blue (astral blue), opaque black (midnight black), pearl white, sakura purple, satin gold, satin silver, snow white, super red, transparent blue (ocean blue), and also Limited Edition color Pink, which was distributed in some regions such as Oceania, and parts of Asia.

In September 2004, Sony unveiled its third major hardware revision. Available in late October 2004, it was smaller, thinner, and quieter than the original versions and included a built-in Ethernet port (in some markets it also had an integrated modem). Due to its thinner profile, it did not contain the 3.5" expansion bay and therefore did not support the internal hard disk drive. It also lacked an internal power supply until a later revision (excluding the Japan version), similar to the GameCube, and had a modified Multitap expansion. The removal of the expansion bay was criticized as a limitation due to the existence of titles such as Final Fantasy XI, which required the HDD use.

Sony also manufactured a consumer device called the PSX that can be used as a digital video recorder and DVD burner in addition to playing PS2 games. The device was released in Japan on 13 December 2003, and was the first Sony product to include the XrossMediaBar interface. It did not sell well in the Japanese market and was not widely released anywhere else.

Online support 

PlayStation 2 users had the option to play select games over the Internet, using dial-up or a broadband Internet connection. The PlayStation 2 Network Adaptor was required for the original models, while the slim models included built-in networking ports. Instead of having a unified, subscription-based online service like Xbox Live as competitor Microsoft later chose for its Xbox console, online multiplayer functionality on the PlayStation 2 was the responsibility of the game publisher and ran on third-party servers. Many games that supported online play exclusively supported broadband Internet access.

Controllers

The PlayStation 2's DualShock 2 controller retains most of the same functionality as its predecessor. However, it includes analogue pressure sensitivity to over 100 individual levels of depth on the face, shoulder and D-pad buttons, replacing the digital buttons of the original. Like its predecessor, the DualShock 2 controller has force feedback, or "vibration" functionality. It is lighter and includes two more levels of vibration.

Specialized controllers include light guns (GunCon), fishing rod and reel controllers, a Dragon Quest VIII "slime" controller, a Final Fantasy X-2 "Tiny Bee" dual pistol controller, an Onimusha 3 katana controller, and a Resident Evil 4 chainsaw controller.

Peripherals

Optional hardware includes additional DualShock or DualShock 2 controllers, a PS2 DVD remote control, an internal or external hard disk drive (HDD), a network adapter, horizontal and vertical stands, PlayStation or PS2 memory cards, the multitap for PlayStation or PS2, a USB motion camera (EyeToy), a USB keyboard and mouse, and a headset.

The original PS2 multitap (SCPH-10090) cannot be plugged into the newer slim models. The multitap connects to the memory card slot and the controller slot, and the memory card slot on the slimline is shallower. New slim-design multitaps (SCPH-70120) were manufactured for these models; however, third-party adapters also permit original multitaps to be used.

Early versions of the PS2 could be networked via an i.LINK port, though this had little game support and was dropped. Some third-party manufacturers have created devices that allow disabled people to access the PS2 through ordinary switches, etc.

Some third-party companies, such as JoyTech, have produced LCD monitor and speaker attachments for the PS2, which attach to the back of the console. These allow users to play games without access to a television as long as there is access to mains electricity or a similar power source. These screens can fold down onto the PS2 in a similar fashion to laptop screens.

There are many accessories for musical games, such as dance pads for Dance Dance Revolution, In the Groove, and Pump It Up titles and High School Musical 3: Senior Year Dance. Konami microphones for use with the Karaoke Revolution games, dual microphones (sold with and used exclusively for SingStar games), various "guitar" controllers (for the Guitar Freaks series and Guitar Hero series), the drum set controller (sold in a box set (or by itself) with a "guitar" controller and a USB microphone (for use with Rock Band and Guitar Hero series, World Tour and newer), and a taiko drum controller for Taiko: Drum Master.

Unlike the PlayStation, which requires the use of an official Sony PlayStation Mouse to play mouse-compatible games, the few PS2 games with mouse support work with a standard USB mouse as well as a USB trackball. In addition, some of these games also support the usage of a USB keyboard for text input, game control (instead of a DualShock or DualShock 2 gamepad, in tandem with a USB mouse), or both.

Game library

PlayStation 2 software is distributed on CD-ROM and DVD-ROM; the two formats are differentiated by their discs' bottoms, with CD-ROMs being blue and DVD-ROMs being silver. The PlayStation 2 offered some particularly high-profile exclusive games. Most main entries in the Grand Theft Auto, Final Fantasy, and Metal Gear Solid series were released exclusively for the console. Several prolific series got their start on the PlayStation 2, including God of War, Ratchet & Clank, Jak and Daxter, Devil May Cry, Kingdom Hearts, and Sly Cooper. Grand Theft Auto: San Andreas was the best-selling game on the console.

Game releases peaked in 2004, but declined with the release of the PlayStation 3 in 2006. The last new games for the console were Final Fantasy XI: Seekers of Adoulin in Asia, FIFA 14 in North America, and Pro Evolution Soccer 2014 in Europe. As of 30 June 2007, a total of 10,035 software titles had been released worldwide including games released in multiple regions as separate titles.

Reception
Initial reviews in 2000 of the PlayStation 2 highly acclaimed the console, with reviewers commending its hardware and graphics capabilities, its ability to play DVDs, and the system's backwards compatibility with games and hardware for the original PlayStation. Early points of criticism included the lack of online support at the time, its inclusion of only two controller ports, and the system's price at launch compared to the Dreamcast in 2000. PC Magazine in 2001 called the console "outstanding", praising its "noteworthy components" such as the Emotion Engine CPU, 32MB of RAM, support for IEEE 1394 (branded as "i.LINK" by Sony and "FireWire" by Apple), and the console's two USB ports while criticizing its "expensive" games and its support for only two controllers without the multitap accessory.

Later reviews, especially after the launch of the competing GameCube and Xbox systems, continued to praise the PlayStation 2's large game library and DVD playback, while routinely criticizing the PlayStation 2's lesser graphics performance compared to the newer systems and its rudimentary online service compared to Xbox Live. In 2002, CNET rated the console 7.3 out of 10, calling it a "safe bet" despite not being the "newest or most powerful", noting that the console "yields in-game graphics with more jagged edges". CNET also criticized the DVD playback functionality, claiming that the console's video quality was "passable" and that the playback controls were "rudimentary", recommending users to purchase a remote control. The console's two controller ports and the high cost of its memory cards were also a point of criticism.

The slim model of the PlayStation 2 received positive reviews for its incredibly small size and built-in networking, but received criticism for easily overheating due to exclusion of the original model’s built-in fan. The requirement for a separate power adapter was criticized while the top-loading disc drive was noted as being less likely to break compared to the tray-loading drive of the original model.

Sales

Demand for the PlayStation 2 remained strong throughout much of its lifespan, selling over 1.4 million units in Japan by 31 March 2000. Over 10.6 million units were sold worldwide by 31 March 2001. In 2005, the PlayStation 2 became the fastest game console to reach 100 million units shipped, accomplishing the feat within 5 years and 9 months from its launch; this was surpassed 4 years later when the Nintendo DS reached 100 million shipments in 4 years and 5 months from its launch. By July 2009, the system had sold 138.8 million units worldwide, with 51 million of those units sold in PAL regions.

Overall, over 155 million PlayStation 2 units were sold worldwide by 31 March 2012, the year Sony officially stopped supplying updated sales numbers of the system.

Homebrew development

Using homebrew programs, it is possible to play various audio and video file formats on a PS2. Homebrew programs can also play patched backups of original PS2 DVD games on unmodified consoles and install retail discs to an installed hard drive on older models. Homebrew emulators of older computer and gaming systems have been developed for the PS2.

Sony released a Linux-based operating system, Linux for PlayStation 2, for the PS2 in a package that also includes a keyboard, mouse, Ethernet adapter and HDD. In Europe and Australia, the PS2 comes with a free Yabasic interpreter on the bundled demo disc. This allows users to create simple programs for the PS2. A port of the NetBSD project and BlackRhino GNU/Linux, an alternative Debian-based distribution, are also available for the PS2.

Successor

The PlayStation 3 was released in Japan and North America in November 2006 and Europe in March 2007.

See also

 Linux for PlayStation 2
 PCSX2 – PlayStation 2 (PS2) emulator for Microsoft Windows, Linux, and macOS
 PlayStation Broadband Navigator

References

Citations

Bibliography

 
2000s in video gaming
2000s toys
2010s toys
2000 in video gaming

Backward-compatible video game consoles
Computer-related introductions in 2000
Discontinued video game consoles
Home video game consoles
PlayStation (brand)
Products introduced in 2000
Products and services discontinued in 2013
Sixth-generation video game consoles
Sony consoles